The HSL 2 is a  Belgian high-speed rail line between Leuven and Ans (near Liège) and is  long, all of it on dedicated high-speed tracks, which began service on 15 December 2002. As part of the Belgian railway network, it is owned, technically operated and maintained by Infrabel.

Since the extension to the German border was completed (the HSL 3), the fastest journey time between Brussels South and Cologne Central Station is 1 hour and 47 minutes. HSL 2 is used by Thalys and ICE trains as well as fast internal Belgian Railways InterCity services.

Route
 From Brussels South, trains travel northwards over Line 0 through Central and North stations. At Schaarbeek the route splits in two; northward bound trains continue over line 25N, line 25, Antwerp and HSL 4 to the Dutch border, eastward bound trains continue over line 36N, line 2 and line 36 to Liège and from there over line 37 and HSL 3 and again line 37 to the German border.

After the Bierbeek tunnel (758 m), maximum speed is increased to  alongside the E40 motorway.

Other
HSL 2 is used by  Thalys PBKA sets, ICE 3M EMUs on international services, and  domestic InterCity services run by sets of Class 18 or Class 13 locomotives with I6, I10 or (mostly) I11 carriages. Trains with the new SNCB Class 18 locomotives appeared on the line. probably in 2010. The DB Velaro D (BR407) was planned to use the route on its way to London, however these plans have since been shelved due to technical and financial problems, and it is unknown if the units will find use on the current ICE International services from Brussels to Germany.

Maintenance bases for the line are situated at Leuven and Ans.

The Belgian cabin signaling system TBL 2 has been installed on the HSL 2. It is operated from Block 12 in Brussels.

HSL 2 is standard gauge, double track, electrified at 25 kV, 50 Hz AC.

See also
 High-speed rail in Belgium
 Rail transport in Belgium

References

External links

Belrail: info on TBL 2 (in French)
Belrail: HSL 2 (in  French)
Railways in Belgium: HSL 2

High-speed railway lines in Belgium
Railway lines opened in 2002
Standard gauge railways in Belgium
2002 establishments in Belgium

lb:LGV Bréissel - Däitsch Grenz